Taylor Tharp (born September 20, 1984) is a former American football quarterback for the Carolina Panthers of the National Football League (NFL). He signed with the Carolina Panthers as an undrafted free agent following the 2008 NFL Draft. Tharp also played Arena football and in Italian Football League (IFL). He played college football at Boise State. He is known for designing the Statue of Liberty play, which gave Boise State the win in overtime of the 2007 Fiesta Bowl.

College

As the Broncos' starting quarterback in 2007, Tharp finished his senior season ranked seventh-nationally in passing efficiency (152.85) en route to second-team All-Western Athletic Conference honors, completing 289-of-423 passes for 3,340 yards and 30 touchdowns. At the time, his completion total was Boise State's single-season record.

Professional career

Upon graduating from Boise State with a degree in communications in 2007, Tharp signed a free agent contract with the Carolina Panthers of the National Football League. 

Tharp then played two years in the Arena Football League - starting at quarterback for the Boise Burn in 2009 and for the Utah Blaze in 2010.

Tharp went on to serve as an offensive intern coach for the Arizona Rattlers of the AFL in 2010.

Italian Football League
Tharp played two seasons 2011-2012 for the Parma Panthers of the Italian Football League. He served as the team's quarterback and quarterbacks coach, leading the Panthers to two IFL championships.

Coaching

In 2012-2013, Tharp was a graduate assistant coach at Longhorns, Tharp broke down game film, compiled scouting reports, coached the defensive scout team and assisted with offensive game plans. Tharp also served as Texas' summer football camps coordinator.

Taylor Tharp is currently the Director of Player Personnel at Boise State University, a position which he has held since 2014.

External links

Boise State Broncos bio
Carolina Panthers bio
Parma Panthers Football Roster
Arena Football Statistics

1984 births
Living people
Sportspeople from Boulder, Colorado
American football quarterbacks
Boise State Broncos football players
Carolina Panthers players
Boise Burn players
Utah Blaze players
Texas Longhorns football coaches
Boise State Broncos football coaches
American expatriate sportspeople in Italy
American expatriate players of American football